Turanogryllus is a genus of crickets in the family Gryllidae and tribe Turanogryllini.  Species can be found in Africa, Greece in Europe and throughout Asia.

Species 
Turanogryllus includes the following species:

Turanogryllus aelleni Chopard, 1954
Turanogryllus aurangabadensis Vasanth, 1980
Turanogryllus babaulti Chopard, 1963
Turanogryllus cephalomaculatus Pajni & Madhu, 1988
Turanogryllus charandasi Pajni & Madhu, 1988
Turanogryllus dehradunensis Bhowmik, 1969
Turanogryllus eous Bey-Bienko, 1956
Turanogryllus fascifrons Chopard, 1969
Turanogryllus flavolateralis Chopard, 1934
Turanogryllus ghoshi Vasanth, 1980
Turanogryllus globosiceps Chopard, 1960
Turanogryllus gratus Gorochov, 1996
Turanogryllus histrio Saussure, 1877
Turanogryllus indicus Gorochov, 1990
Turanogryllus jammuensis Bhowmik, 1967
Turanogryllus kitale Otte, 1987
Turanogryllus lateralis (Fieber, 1853) - type species (as Gryllus lateralis Fieber; locality, southern Russia)
Turanogryllus levigatus Pajni & Madhu, 1988
Turanogryllus lindbergi Chopard, 1960
Turanogryllus machadoi Chopard, 1962
Turanogryllus maculithorax Chopard, 1969
Turanogryllus mau Otte, 1987
Turanogryllus melasinotus Li & Zheng, 1998
Turanogryllus microlyra Chopard, 1938
Turanogryllus mitrai Bhowmik, 1985
Turanogryllus niloticus Saussure, 1877
Turanogryllus nimba Otte, 1987
Turanogryllus pakistanus Ghouri & Ahmad, 1959
Turanogryllus rufoniger Chopard, 1925
Turanogryllus scorteccii Chopard, 1965
Turanogryllus sexlineatus Chopard, 1963
Turanogryllus sombo Otte, 1987
Turanogryllus stolyarovi Gorochov, 1986
Turanogryllus tarbinskii Bey-Bienko, 1968
Turanogryllus vicinus Chopard, 1967
Turanogryllus virgulatus Bolívar, 1900
Turanogryllus wahrmani Chopard, 1963

References

External links
 

Ensifera genera
Gryllinae
Orthoptera of Africa
Orthoptera of Asia